The Damsgård Tunnel is a road tunnel in the city of Bergen in Vestland county, Norway. It consists of two tubes, each of which carries two lanes of traffic through the Damsgårdsfjellet mountain between the neighborhoods of Lyngbø and Gyldenpris and the onwards towards the city centre. The northern end of the tunnel lies adjacent to the entrance to the Løvstakk Tunnel and the Puddefjord Bridge.  The tunnel is one of the major arterial highways leading west from the city centre.

The Damsgård Tunnel is part of Norwegian National Road 555 which runs from Fjell to Bergen's city centre. The average daily traffic through the Damsgård Tunnel was 35,127 vehicles in 2007, up from 29,336 in 2000.

References

Road tunnels in Bergen
1992 establishments in Norway
Norwegian National Road 555
Tunnels completed in 1992